John Miller Andrews,  (17 July 1871 – 5 August 1956) was the second Prime Minister of Northern Ireland from 1940 to 1943.

Family life
Andrews was born in Comber, County Down, Ireland in 1871, the eldest child in the family of four sons and one daughter of Thomas Andrews, flax spinner, and his wife Eliza Pirrie, a sister of Viscount Pirrie, chairman of Harland and Wolff.

He was educated at the Royal Belfast Academical Institution. In business, Andrews was a landowner, a director of his family linen-bleaching company and of the Belfast Ropeworks. His younger brother, Thomas Andrews, who died in the 1912 sinking of the RMS Titanic, was managing director of the Harland and Wolff shipyard in Belfast; another brother, Sir James Andrews, 1st Baronet, was Lord Chief Justice of Northern Ireland.

In 1902 he married Jessie (died 1950), eldest daughter of Bolton stockbroker Joseph Ormrod at Rivington Unitarian Chapel, Rivington, near Chorley, Lancashire, England. They had one son and two daughters. His younger brother, Sir James, married Jessie's sister.

Political career
Andrews was elected as a member of parliament in the House of Commons of Northern Ireland, sitting from 1921 until 1953 (for County Down constituency from 1921 to 1929 and for Mid-Down from 1929 to 1953). He was a founder member of the Ulster Unionist Labour Association, which he chaired, and was Minister of Labour from 1921 to 1937. He was Minister of Finance from 1937 to 1940, succeeding to the position on the death of Hugh MacDowell Pollock; on the death of Lord Craigavon, in 1940, he became leader of the Ulster Unionist Party (UUP) and the second Prime Minister of Northern Ireland.

In April 1943 backbench dissent forced him from office. He was replaced as Prime Minister by Sir Basil Brooke. Andrews remained, however, the recognised leader of the UUP for a further three years. Five years later he became the Grand Master of the Orange Order. From 1949, he was the last parliamentary survivor of the original 1921 Northern Ireland Parliament, and as such was recognised as the Father of the House. He is the only Prime Minister of Northern Ireland not to have been granted a peerage; his predecessor and successor received hereditary viscountcies, and later prime ministers were granted life peerages.

Throughout his life he was deeply involved in the Orange Order; he held the positions of Grand Master of County Down from 1941 and Grand Master of Ireland (1948–1954). In 1949 he was appointed Imperial Grand Master of the Grand Orange Council of the World.

Andrews was a committed and active member of the Non-subscribing Presbyterian Church of Ireland. He regularly attended Sunday worship, in the church built on land donated by his great-grandfather James Andrews in his home town Comber. Andrews served on the Comber Congregational Committee from 1896 until his death in 1956 (holding the position of Chairman from 1935 onwards). He is buried in the small graveyard adjoining the church.

He was named after his maternal great-uncle, John Miller of Comber (1795–1883).

References

Sources
 Clatteringford Irish Linen – Family Business
 Prominent Persons Index card from the Public Record Office of Northern Ireland
 History of Party leaders at the Ulster Unionist Party website
 The National Archives of the United Kingdom, with reference to the Public Records Office of Northern Ireland and containing a link to the Oxford Dictionary of National Biography (for subscribers only)
 Scoular, Clive (2004). John M. Andrews: Northern Ireland's Wartime Prime Minister by Clive Scoular.

1871 births
1956 deaths
People from Comber
High Sheriffs of Down
Leaders of the Ulster Unionist Party
Members of the Order of the Companions of Honour
Ulster Unionist Party members of the House of Commons of Northern Ireland
Members of the House of Commons of Northern Ireland 1921–1925
Members of the House of Commons of Northern Ireland 1925–1929
Members of the House of Commons of Northern Ireland 1929–1933
Members of the House of Commons of Northern Ireland 1933–1938
Members of the House of Commons of Northern Ireland 1938–1945
Members of the House of Commons of Northern Ireland 1945–1949
Members of the House of Commons of Northern Ireland 1949–1953
Northern Ireland Cabinet ministers (Parliament of Northern Ireland)
Members of the Privy Council of Northern Ireland
Members of the Privy Council of Ireland
Presbyterians from Northern Ireland
People educated at the Royal Belfast Academical Institution
Prime Ministers of Northern Ireland
Ulster Scots people
Grand Masters of the Orange Order
Ministers of Finance of Northern Ireland
Members of the House of Commons of Northern Ireland for County Down constituencies